Heart of a Man is an album by the American R&B singer Tony Terry, released in 1994. It charted in the top 50 on Billboard'''s Top R&B Albums chart.

Critical receptionUSA Today wrote that Terry's "urgent, gut-wrenching voice, spanning tenor to falsetto, soars on meaty material." The Tampa Tribune'' thought that "this pretty-boy crooner sticks with his strengths, which include showcasing some emotional weaknesses."

Track listing
"When a Man Cries" – 4:03
"When Will I See You Again" – 5:23
"Save Your Love" – 5:05
"I Love You More Than You'll Ever Know" – 6:07
"Heart of a Man" – 4:37
"Don't Give Up a Good Man" – 3:54
"Surrender" – 5:06
"Can't Let Go" – 4:54
"My Prayer" – 5:20
"I'm Sorry" – 6:01

References

External links
Heart of a Man at Discogs

Tony Terry albums
1994 albums
Virgin Records albums